On a stringed instrument, a break in an otherwise ascending (or descending) order of string pitches is known as a re-entry.  A re-entrant tuning, therefore, is a tuning where the strings (or more properly the courses) are not all ordered from the lowest pitch to the highest pitch (or vice versa).

Most common re-entrant tunings have only one re-entry. In the case of the ukulele, for example, the re-entry is between the third and fourth strings, while in the case of the Venezuelan cuatro it is between the first and second strings.

Instruments 
Instruments usually tuned in this way include:
 Baroque (5-course) guitar
 Five-string banjo
 Charango
 Cittern
 Venezuelan Cuatro
 Laouto
 Lirone
 Mexican Guitarrón
 Mexican vihuela
 Rajão
 Sitar
 Theorbo
 Tonkori
 Soprano and concert ukuleles
 Tres Cubano/Cuban Tres

Instruments often (but not always) re-entrantly tuned include:
 Tenor guitar
 Ten string classical guitar
 Tenor and Baritone (occasionally) ukuleles
 10-bass Gibson Style U Harp guitar

Instruments not usually considered re-entrant, but which have common re-entrant alternate tunings:
 Guitar (Nashville high tuning and Joe Beck's alto guitar tuning)
 Pedal steel guitar (C6 tuning and E9 tuning)

The standard tunings for instruments with multi-string courses, such as the twelve string guitar, eight string bass, or Colombian tiple are not considered re-entrant, as the principal strings of each course are ordered from lowest to highest.

Ukulele

Ukuleles other than the tenor and baritone are most commonly tuned in re-entrant fashion; the tenor often is as well, and occasionally the baritone. These conventional re-entrant tunings G4–C4–E4–A4 are sometimes known as high 4th tunings or high G tuning.

Non-re-entrant tunings, also known as low 4th tunings, exist for these instruments.

Charango

The Andean charango, a small 5-course, 10-string guitar frequently made from an armadillo shell, is  most usually tuned in re-entrant fashion, with re-entry before and after the octave strung third course.

Other members of the charango family, such as the hualaycho and charangon are usually similarly tuned; the ronroco is often, but not always tuned re-entrantly.

Ten-string guitar

The ten string classical guitar was originally designed for a specific re-entrant tuning invented by Narciso Yepes, now called the Modern tuning also. Both this and other re-entrant tunings, such as the Marlow tunings, are now used, as well as non re-entrant tunings such as the Baroque; nevertheless the advantage of the Yepes re-entrant tuning over the other tunings is that it provides sympathetic resonance over all the 12 notes of the scale while the rest do not. These tunings may also be used on related instruments, such as ten string electric and jazz guitars.

Cuatro

The Venezuelan cuatro is a member of the guitar family, smaller in size and with four nylon strings. It is similar in size and construction to the ukulele. The traditional "Camburpinton" tuning is re-entrant (A–D–F–B), but with the re-entry between the second and first strings, rather than between third and fourth as in the ukulele. The results are very different in tone.

Other tunings of the Venezuelan cuatro are not re-entrant, however they are not as popular as the "Camburpinton" tuning.

The Venezuelan instrument is one of several Latin American instruments by the name of cuatro, which is Spanish for four. Despite the name, not all instruments called 'cuatro' have four strings. The ten-string, five-course Puerto Rican cuatro is not tuned re-entrantly, but in straight fourths. The cuatro Cubano also is not tuned re-entrantly.

Tenor guitar

A variety of tunings are used for the four string tenor guitar, including a relatively small number of re-entrant tunings. One example of a re-entrant tuning for tenor guitar is D4–G3–B3–E4 with strings 3–1 as for the normal 6-string guitar, but string 4 tuned to D an octave above the 4th string of the 6 string guitar.

Banjo

The fifth string on the five string banjo, called the thumb string, also called the "drone string", is five frets shorter than the other four and is normally tuned higher than any of the other four, giving a re-entrant tuning such as the bluegrass G4-D3-G3-B3-D4. The five string banjo is particularly used in bluegrass music and old-time music.

The four string plectrum banjo (more often used in jazz) and the four string tenor banjo (common in Irish traditional music) lack this shorter string, and are rarely tuned in re-entrant fashion.

References

Musical techniques
String instruments